The Lesbian/Gay Chorus of San Francisco (LGCSF) was founded in 1980 by Jon Reed Sims (1947–1984). The world's first choral organization to use both "lesbian" and "gay" in its name, LGCSF is dedicated to building and enriching its communities through the universal language of music.

Selected concerts
BrokeBACH Mountain, November 18 and 19, 2011, Mission Cultural Center for Latino Arts, San Francisco, CA
A Shameless Show of Holiday Shite, December 18 and 19, 2011, Martuni's Piano Bar, San Francisco, CA
Love Bites, and so did the 80s, February 10, 11, and 12, 2012, Missional Cultural Center for Latino Arts, San Francisco, CA
World Premiere: A Harvey Milk Cantata, April 27, 2012, Lick-Wilmerding High School, San Francisco, CA
34th Annual Pride Concert: A Harvey Milk Cantata, June 22, 2012, San Francisco Conservatory of Music, San Francisco, CA
35th Annual Pride Concert: Ripped From The Headlines! Music Celebrating LGBT Stories, June 22, 2013, San Francisco Conservatory of Music, San Francisco, CA
We Celebrate!, November 16, 2013, First Unitarian Church, San Francisco, CA
Swing Break, April 11 and 12, 2014, Mission Cultural Center for Latino Arts, San Francisco, CA

Music directors
Robin Kay (1980)
Pat Parr
Trent Morant
Michael Carlson
Jerry R. Foust
Stephanie Lynne Smith (2002–2010)
William "Billy" Sauerland  (2011–2017)
Michael Reilly (2017–present)

Awards
Best Concert, Cable Car Awards (multiple recipient)
Bob Cramer Award for Excellence, Cable Car Awards, 1992
Arts Excellence Award, San Francisco Chamber of Commerce, 1994

Recordings
Together in Harmony (1994)
Wish You Were Here (2000)
25th Anniversary (2005)
Group Therapy (2005)

Affiliations
Gay and Lesbian Association of Choruses (GALA Choruses)

Notes and references

See also
San Francisco Gay Men's Chorus

External links

GALA Choruses, Inc. official website
LEGATO official website

Choirs in California
History of San Francisco
LGBT choruses
Musical groups established in 1980
LGBT culture in San Francisco
1980 establishments in California